Thiaridae, common name thiarids or trumpet snails, is a family of tropical freshwater snails with an operculum, aquatic gastropod mollusks in the superfamily Cerithioidea.

Taxonomy
Many species of freshwater snails that are characterized by a turreted shell were originally placed within the genus Melania Lamarck, 1799. This genus as delimited by authors of the late 19th and early 20th century contained hundreds of species, and was successively split into different groupings.
Over time, infrageneric groups (subgenera) were elevated to the rank of independent genera and the genus Melania was elevated to the rank of a family, Melanidae.

However, the genus name Melania Lamarck, 1799 was demonstrated to be a junior synonym of the genus name Thiara Röding, 1798. Consequently, the family had to be renamed Thiaridae. Moreover, the Melanidae as traditionally circumscribed were found to be polyphyletic, containing species from many different groups, which were successively recognized as distinct families, such as the Pachychilidae, Semisulcospiridae, Pleuroceridae, Melanopsidae, and Paludomidae. Therefore, the Thiaridae as currently circumscribed contain fewer species than the Melaniidae.

Distribution
This family of snails is found worldwide, and are particularly diverse in the tropics and subtropics.

Ecology 
These snails are freshwater inhabitants of temperate and warm zones.

Thiaridae are partly viviparous, partly ovoviviparous.
Many, but not all species are parthenogenetic.

Genera
Genera in the family Thiaridae include:
Subfamily Thiarinae Gill, 1871 (1823)
 Balanocochlis Fischer, 1885 
 Balanocochlis glandiformis
 Balanocochlis glans
 Culenmelania Z.-X. Qian, J. Yang, Y. Lu & J. He, 2012
 † Kumania Ota, 1960 
 Melanoides Olivier, 1804
 Mieniplotia Low & Tan, 2014
 Neoradina Brandt, 1974
 † Pachymelania E. A. Smith, 1893: synonym of † Pachychiloides Wenz, 1939  (junior homonym of Pachymelania E. A. Smith, 1893; Pachychiloides Wenz, 1939 is a replacement name)
 Plotia Röding, 1798: synonym of Pyramidella Lamarck, 1799
 Plotiopsis Brot, 1874 - Plotiopsis balonnensis (Conrad, 1850)
 Ripalania Iredale, 1943
 Sermyla Adams, 1854
 Stenomelania Fischer, 1885 
 Tarebia H. Adams & A. Adams, 1854
 Thiara Röding, 1798 - type genus of the family Thiaridae, synonym: Melania Lamarck, 1799
Not assigned to a subfamily
 † Brotiopsis K. Suzuki, 1943 
 † Coptostylus F. Sandberger, 1872
 † Cornetia Munier-Chalmas in Fischer et al., 1885 
 † Ellinoria Van Damme & Pickford, 2003 
 Fijidoma Morrison, 1952
 † Hannatoma Olsson, 1931 
 † Heynderycxia Van Damme & Pickford, 2003 
 † Juramelanatria Bandel, 1991 
 † Juramelanoides Bandel, 1991 
 Longiverena Pilsbry & Olsson, 1935
 † Melabrina Stache, 1880 
 † Melanotarebia Bandel & Kowalke, 1997
 † Pseudopyrgula Wenz, 1928 
 † Ptychomelania Sacco, 1895 
 † Sengoeria Harzhauser, Mandic, Büyükmeriç, Neubauer, Kadolsky & Landau, 2016 
 † Sinomelania Yen, 1936 
 † Siragimelania Suzuki, 1940
 † Tianjinospira Youluo, 1978 
 Verena H. Adams & A. Adams, 1854
 † Yoshimonia Ota, 1960

References
This article incorporates public domain text from the reference

Further reading 
 Glaubrecht M., Brinkmann N. & Pöppe J. (2009). "Diversity and disparity down under: Systematics, biogeography and reproductive modes of the marsupial freshwater Thiaridae (Caenogastropoda, Cerithioidea) in Australia". Zoosystematics and Evolution 85(2): 199-275.

External links